Town Bank grammar school was an Early Modern grammar school in Ulverston, Lancashire from its foundation in 1658 until 1900. It was founded through a benefaction in the will of Thomas Fell.

A pupil's view in the late 18th century was:

From 1879 to 1882 the master was Arthur Richard Shilleto.

A parliamentary charity commissioner inquiry was launched in April 1893.

The school was replaced by the Victoria Grammar School in 1900 and its endowment was used to provide two scholarships to the new school.

References

External links
Photo of school in 1884
Cumbria archive catalogue

Defunct schools in Cumbria
Ulverston
1658 establishments in England
Defunct grammar schools in England